La Zandunga is a 1938 Mexican romantic drama film directed by Fernando de Fuentes and starring the "Mexican Spitfire" Lupe Vélez.

Plot

In a little town around Tehuantepec, in Oaxaca, México, lives a beautiful and cheerful girl named Lupe (Lupe Vélez), in love with a stranger marine named Juancho (Arturo de Córdova). The man should go to Veracruz and promises Lupe return to marry. After several months, Lupe lost hope of seeing him again and accepts the offer of other man to marry.

Cast
 Lupe Vélez as Lupe
 Arturo de Córdova as Juancho
 Joaquín Pardavé as Don Catarino
 María Luisa Zea as Marilú
 Rafael Falcón as Ramón
 Carlos López "El Chaflán" as The Secretary

Production notes
This was the first Spanish-speaking movie for Lupe Vélez, who, after a massive career in Hollywood, returned to México to take advantage of her popularity among Hispanic audiences.

External links

1938 films
Mexican black-and-white films
1938 romantic drama films
Films directed by Miguel M. Delgado
1930s Spanish-language films
Mexican romantic drama films
1930s Mexican films